George Ferry (8 August 1931 – 6 February 2005) was an Australian rules footballer who played for the Carlton Football Club from 1952 to 1961.

Ferry was a "popular full-back during one of the bleakest periods in Carlton's history."

References

External links
 
 

1931 births
2005 deaths
Carlton Football Club players
Australian rules footballers from Victoria (Australia)